Penicillium dendriticum is an anamorph species of the genus of Penicillium which produces Secalonic acid D and Secalonic acid F.

See also
 List of Penicillium species

References 

dendriticum
Fungi described in 1980